Cosmic time, or cosmological time, is the time coordinate commonly used in the Big Bang models of physical cosmology. Such time coordinate may be defined for a homogeneous, expanding universe so that the universe has the same density everywhere at each moment in time (the fact that this is possible means that the universe is, by definition, homogeneous). The clocks measuring cosmic time should move along the Hubble flow.

Cosmic time  is a measure of time by a physical clock with zero peculiar velocity in the absence of matter over-/under-densities (to prevent time dilation due to relativistic effects or confusions caused by expansion of the universe). Unlike other measures of time such as temperature, redshift, particle horizon, or Hubble horizon, the cosmic time (similar and complementary to the comoving coordinates) is blind to the expansion of the universe.

There are two main ways for establishing a reference point for the cosmic time. The most trivial way is to take the present time as the cosmic reference point (sometimes referred to as the lookback time).

Alternatively, the Big Bang may be taken as reference to define  as the age of the universe, also known as time since the big bang. The current physical cosmology estimates the present age as 13.8 billion years. The  doesn't necessarily have to correspond to a physical event (such as the cosmological singularity) but rather it refers to the point at which the scale factor would vanish for a standard cosmological model such as ΛCDM. For instance, in the case of inflation, i.e. a non-standard cosmology, the hypothetical moment of big bang is still determined using the benchmark cosmological models which may coincide with the end of the inflationary epoch. For technical purposes, concepts such as the average temperature of the universe (in units of eV) or the particle horizon are used when the early universe is the objective of a study since understanding the interaction among particles is more relevant than their time coordinate or age.

Cosmic time is the standard time coordinate for specifying the Friedmann–Lemaître–Robertson–Walker solutions of Einstein field equations.

See also 
 Chronology of the universe
 Cosmic Calendar
 Cosmological horizon

Notes

References
 
 

Physical cosmology
Coordinate systems
Time